Castlecaldwell railway station served Castle Caldwell in  County Fermanagh in Northern Ireland.

The Enniskillen and Bundoran Railway opened the station on 13 June 1866. Services were provided by the Irish North Western Railway.

The station was moved in 1870 half a mile closer to Bundoran and reopened on 1 August.

It was taken over by the Great Northern Railway (Ireland) in 1876.

It closed on 1 October 1957.

Routes

References

Disused railway stations in County Fermanagh
Railway stations opened in 1866
Railway stations closed in 1957
1866 establishments in Ireland
Railway stations in Northern Ireland opened in the 19th century